"Broken Down" is official second single off album Seasons by the American rock band Sevendust which was released in 2004.

Music video
The music video was released in 2004 included part of band's lives and performance in their 2004 tour. An unofficial video for "Broken Down" was released showing footage of The Fast and the Furious: Tokyo Drift film.

Chart position
"Broken Down" peaked at No. 20 on the Billboard Mainstream Rock chart.

Singles

References

Sevendust songs
2003 songs
2004 singles
Songs written by Morgan Rose
TVT Records singles